Dreadnaught is a 1981 Hong Kong martial arts comedy-horror film starring Yuen Biao and directed by Yuen Woo-ping. The film was released on 5 March 1981.

Plot 
A short-tempered, violent criminal named White Tiger is on the run from the police and joins a theater troupe to hide out, killing anyone who angers him or who suspects his identity. One person he unsuccessfully tries to kill several times is a cowardly laundry man named Mousy, who manages to escape by fleeing. When Mousy's close friend and elder brother figure, Leung Foon, is killed by White Tiger, Mousy overcomes his cowardliness enough to seek revenge.

In a scene early on in the film, Mousy is washing the laundry with his bossy sister. After complaining about the repetitiveness of laundry work, his sister scolds him and demands he wash the clothes in the "family way." This leads to a scene with Mousy flipping the clothes around with his hands and wringing them out with powerful squeezing from his index finger and middle finger. These abilities turn out to be related to kung-fu methods, as Mousy eventually uses the same laundry method to defeat White Tiger.

Cast 
 Yuen Biao as Mousy
 Bryan Leung as Leung Foon
 Kwan Tak-hing as Wong Fei-hung
 Philip Ko as Tam King
 Yuen Shun-yee as White Tiger
 Lily Li as Mousy's sister 
 Tong Ching as Mousy's love interest
 Fan Mei-sheng as Marshal Pao 
 Brandy Yuen as Marshal's assistant
 Yuen Cheung-yan as Marshal's assistant
 Fung Hak-on as Demon Tailor
 Danny Chow as Gorgeous Koon
 Chiu Chi-hing as Chai
 San Kuai as Iron Swallow
 Yuen Lung-kui
 Yuen Qiu as White Tiger's wife
 Lee Chun-wah as Biggie (Big Mouth)
 Yue Tau-wan as Snake Tongue
 Fung Ging Man as Man who opens Opera House
 Sai Gwa-Pau as Wong Fei-hung's servant
 Cheung Chok-chow as Mayor at Wong's party
 Lee Fat-yuen as Molestor
 Tsui Oi-sam as Gorgeous Koon's fan
 Ho Tin-shing as Boss Huang's servant
 Fung Ming
 Sa Au as Taoist
 Yuen Woo-ping as extra
 Man Ngai-tik
 Ho Po-sing
 Yeung Wah
 To Wing-leung
 Siu Tak-foo
 To Wai-wo

References

External links 
 Dreadnaught at Hong Kong Cinemagic
 
 

1981 films
1981 martial arts films
1980s comedy horror films
1980s martial arts comedy films
1980s Cantonese-language films
Films directed by Yuen Woo-ping
Hong Kong comedy horror films
Hong Kong martial arts comedy films
Kung fu films
1980s Hong Kong films